Patrick "Packey" McFarland (November 1, 1888 – September 22, 1936) was an American boxer in the lightweight and welterweight divisions. Despite an extraordinary winning record, he was unable to secure a match for either world title. The Ring Record Book and Boxing Encyclopedia suggests McFarland was the best fighter never to become a world champion.

Professional career

McFarland was born on November 1, 1888, in Chicago, Illinois.

McFarland became a professional boxer in 1904. In 1905 he beat Jimmy Britt, who had a disputed claim to be the lightweight world champion, although this fight was not for a title. In 1908 he defeated future lightweight champion Freddie Welsh in one bout and drew with him in another. He also defeated old foe Britt in another bout that year. In 1910 he met Welsh again for the British version of the lightweight title. The bout ended in another draw, with Welsh retaining his title. McFarland never fought for another world title bout. On April 26, 1912 he beat Matt Wells at Madison Square Garden, in New York City.

He later defeated future welterweight champion Jack Britton during the later part of his career. losing his first fight and winning 98 there on.

He retired in 1915 after fighting to a draw with Mike Gibbons. He was a boxing instructor at Camp Zachary Taylor in 1918. On January 27, 1933, he was appointed to the Illinois Athletic Commission by Governor Henry Horner.  McFarland also managed his sizable investments and was director of two banks.

When interviewed in 1980 actor James Cagney said Packey McFarland "was my idol.  He was a hell of a boxer.  He was a real fighter because he did it all and never even got a black eye.  Which was great of course because of the hero worship I felt for him."   https://www.youtube.com/watch?v=7NYqp-UblWE [James Cagney talks about Packey McFarland 21:27 to 21:51]

Death
McFarland died at Joliet, Illinois, of a streptococcus infection which had attacked his heart.

Professional boxing record
All information in this section is derived from BoxRec, unless otherwise stated.

Official Record

All newspaper decisions are officially regarded as “no decision” bouts and are not counted in the win/loss/draw column.

Unofficial record

Record with the inclusion of newspaper decisions in the win/loss/draw column.

References

External links

 
Cyber Boxing Zone Bio
International Boxing Hall of Fame Bio

1888 births
1936 deaths
Boxers from Chicago
International Boxing Hall of Fame inductees
American male boxers
Welterweight boxers